Alfred Duriau (6 December 1877 – 1958) was a Belgian painter. His work was part of the painting event in the art competition at the 1932 Summer Olympics.

References

1877 births
1958 deaths
20th-century Belgian painters
Belgian painters
Olympic competitors in art competitions
People from Mons